is a passenger railway station located in the city of Toride, Ibaraki Prefecture, Japan operated by the East Japan Railway Company (JR East). It is also shared by the private railway operator Kantō Railway.

Lines
It is a terminus of the  Jōsō Line of the Kantō Railway.

Station layout

The JR East portion of the station has three elevated island platforms serving six tracks. The station has a Midori no Madoguchi staffed ticket office. The Kantō Railway portion of the station has a single ground level island platform.

Platforms

History
The station opened on 25 December 1896. The station was absorbed into the JR East network upon the privatization of the Japanese National Railways (JNR) on 1 April 1987.

A 27-year-old Japanese man was arrested after stabbing 14 people outside of the west entrance of Toride Station on the morning of 17 December 2010. The suspect was alleged to have boarded a bus where he stabbed mostly high school and middle school students, before being subdued. None of the victims were seriously injured.

Passenger statistics
In fiscal 2019, the JR portion of the station was used by an average of 27,277 passengers daily (boarding passengers only). In fiscal 2018, the Kanto Railway portion of the station was used by an average of 11,506 passengers daily (boarding passengers only).

Surrounding area
former Toride-shuku
Toride Velodrome

See also
 List of railway stations in Japan

References

External links

 JR East station information 
 Kanto Railway station information 

Railway stations in Ibaraki Prefecture
Jōban Line
Railway stations in Japan opened in 1896
Toride, Ibaraki